Herpes may refer to:
 Genital herpes, a genital infection
 Herpes simplex, a disease
 Herpes zoster, a disease better known as shingles
Herpes labialis, a disease 
 Herpes (journal), a peer-reviewed medical journal published by Cambridge Medical Publication
 Herpes (beetle), a beetle genus in the tribe Thecesternini
 Herpes, a true bug genus, unresolved taxon, described in 1905 by Melichar
 Herpes simplex virus, organism that causes infection
Herpesviridae, a large family of viruses